Chalcosyrphus (Xylotomima) curvaria (Curran, 1941) the Yellow-haltered Leafwalker, is a common species of syrphid fly  found throughout Northern North America. Hoverflies can  remain nearly motionless  in flight. The  adults are also  known as flower flies for they are commonly found on flowers from which they get both energy-giving nectar and protein rich pollen.

Distribution
Canada, United States.

References

Eristalinae
Diptera of North America
Hoverflies of North America
Insects described in 1941
Taxa named by Charles Howard Curran